The Spring Temple Buddha ( and ) is a colossal statue depicting Vairocana Buddha located in the Zhaocun township of Lushan County, Henan, China, built from 1997 to 2008. It is located within the Fodushan Scenic Area, close to National Freeway no. 311.

Description
The total height of the monument is now said to be .

The project as a whole was estimated to cost around $55 million, $18 million of which was to be spent on the statue. It was originally estimated to consist of 1,100 pieces of copper cast, with a total weight of 1,000 tonnes.

The Foquan Temple, built during the Tang dynasty, houses the Bell of Good Luck, placed on top of Dragon Head peak. This bronze bell weighs 116 tonnes.

Inscribed within the statue's chest is a small reverse swastika (sauwastika).

Gallery

See also

 List of tallest statues

References

External links

Photographs:
close up
Fodushan scenic area

Buildings and structures in Henan
Colossal Buddha statues
Bronze Buddha statues
Copper sculptures in China
Gold sculptures in China
Buddhist temples in Pingdingshan
Colossal statues in China
2008 sculptures
Cultural infrastructure completed in 2008
Tourist attractions in Henan
2008 establishments in China